is a Japanese light novel series written by Hideaki Koyasu with illustrations by Shino. Pony Canyon has published the series in nine volumes from 2013 to 2018 under their Poni Can imprint. An anime television series adaptation by Studio Gokumi aired from October 1 to December 17, 2015.

Plot
The protagonist of the story is Yōtarō Hanabusa, a member of the surviving 21st century Knights, called the "Knights of the world."  Wanting to be a normal person rather than a knight, he leaves everyone behind to set out on his own, but old habits die hard and he finds that like it or not he reflexively acts like a "White Knight" any time someone's in trouble. One day he meets a girl, Kidoin Makio, and learns that she is forced to live completely alone; he takes her under his wing and begins to look after her, all the while hiding his identity as the masked "Knight Lancer" she idolizes.

Characters

 The male protagonist. One of the last remaining knights in the twenty-first century, he has been trained to fight for justice and behave in a "chivalrous" manner that is far removed from normal modern behavior, to such an extent that some individuals have called him strange or even "perverse". This behavior even ruined his friendship with a girl years ago, and since then he has wanted nothing more than to be a normal person. However, his "white knight syndrome" has been so deeply ingrained that he cannot help reverting to old habits when someone is in danger. Out of embarrassment, he wears a mask to hide his identity whenever he does this. After he learns that Makio lives alone and is not allowed to have any relationships, he decides to stay with her and protect her.

 The female protagonist. Daughter of a prominent family, she lives alone and Yōtarō watches over her. She loves the idea of "heroes" who fight for justice and never bow for anyone. For some time she has wanted to be a hero herself and trains every day. One day, when she falls while training, Yotaro, in disguise, saves her. Ever since she has adored her "Knight Lancer", but does not realize that "pathetic" Yōtarō is the same person. After some time, she decides that rather than becoming a hero, she will instead become a great "Lady" whom Knight Lancer can be proud to protect.

 A maid and Yōtarō's stern mentor. Her iron fist has guided his training since childhood, to the point that he blames her for his "White Knight Syndrome".

 A bright and cheerful knight apprentice who serves as Yōtarō's squire.

 A horse that squeals like a pig that was bred and raised to be Yōtarō's steed.

 Makio's personal maid and the only one to stay at the mansion with her long-term. She was once an orphan taken in by the criminal organization "Ban" where she used her hacking skills to commit a variety of crimes. After the knight Gai destroyed Ban, she and the other orphans grew up under his care.

 Yōtarō's classmate and friend. She considers Yōtarō to be a very kind, gentle and dependable boy, and frequently is shown quite close to him; that said, she considers such things as wearing masks and kissing girls' hands to be perverted, and even called Yōtarō a pervert when he saved her before joining her school. After he saves her again and she learns his identity and the reasons for his mask, she forgives him but asks that he stop doing "perverted" things.

Tafei

 An older female knight who's acquainted with Kongouji and Yōtarō's father. Officially, she serves as Knight Leader of East Asian Sector.

 Yōtarō's father, a legendary knight, and Yuma Kidoin's knight.

Yuma Kidoin

 Makio's mother. Shin Hanabusa's princess whom he failed to protect.

 An older knight who serves and protects Makio's father. Years ago, he personally destroyed the criminal organization Ban, and took in all the numerous orphans they'd kidnapped and trained to commit crimes for them. The children alternately call him their "Boss" or their "father".

Media

Light novels

Anime
An anime television series adaptation aired from October 1 to December 17, 2015. Kyōhei Ishiguro directed the series at Studio Gokumi, and original author Hideaki Koyasu was in charge of the scripts. The opening theme is "Light for Knight" by Suzuko Mimori and the ending theme is "Little*Lion*Heart" by Ayana Taketatsu.

Episode list

Reception
The anime adaptation's first episode received poor reviews from Anime News Network's staff during the Fall 2015 season previews. Rebecca Silverman was optimistic of both the Maiko plotline and world-building involving the knights but found negative qualities in the overall production and introduction of the supporting cast. Other staffers were less than favorable. Lynzee Loveridge was critical of the faulty logic and lack of "normalcy" in the plotting, while Nick Creamer called it "flavorless anime custard" for being an "extremely bland light novel adaptation." Theron Martin compared the plot to Kure-nai but with production that is well below its quality level. Hope Chapman criticized the story for playing out like an amalgam of "subpar 4-koma anime" with comedy that comes across more like "pure filler than intentional humor." Zac Bertschy saw the introduction of the premise as "barebones" with characters that offer nothing to get the viewer interested in them.

References

External links
  
 Anime official website 
 

2013 Japanese novels
Action anime and manga
Anime and manga based on light novels
Crunchyroll anime
Fantasy anime and manga
Japanese fantasy novels
Light novels
Pony Canyon
Studio Gokumi
TBS Television (Japan) original programming